Unter (German, 'under', 'below' or 'among') may refer to:

 Unter (playing card), the Jack card in German and Swiss-suited playing cards
 Unter Null, stage name of Erica Dunham, an American musician

See also 
 
 Über (disambiguation), the antonym of Unter
 Unter den Linden, historic boulevard in Berlin, Germany